Polygrammodes cyamon is a moth in the family Crambidae. It was described by Herbert Druce in 1899. It is found in Oaxaca, Mexico.

The forewings are reddish brown, crossed about the middle by a darker brown band from the costal to the inner margin, which is edged with a narrow yellow line. There is an elongate white spot at the end of the cell. The hindwings are white, but the apex, outer margin and fringe are reddish brown.

References

Spilomelinae
Moths described in 1899
Moths of Central America